The 1968–69 St. Louis Blues season was the second in the history of the franchise.  The Blues won the NHL's West Division title for the first time in their history.  In the playoffs, the Blues swept the Philadelphia Flyers and the Los Angeles Kings, winning both series four games to none, before losing the Stanley Cup Finals in four straight to the Montreal Canadiens for the second straight season.

Regular season
On November 7, 1968, Red Berenson scored six goals in a road game versus the Philadelphia Flyers. He became the first player to score a double hat trick on a road game. Goaltenders Glenn Hall and Jacques Plante shared the Vezina Trophy as the NHL's top goalie tandem for that season, and set the Blues' record (broken in 2011–12) of 13 shutouts. For Hall, it was his third Vezina, while Plante, who had come out of retirement during the summer of 1968, took home his seventh. It was the second major award that an NHL expansion team has earned. Hall also earned the Conn Smythe Trophy as the NHL Playoffs MVP the previous season.

Final standings

Record vs. opponents

Schedule and results

Green background indicates win.
Red background indicates regulation loss.
White background indicates tie.

Playoffs

Stanley Cup Finals

Claude Ruel became the eleventh rookie coach to win the Stanley Cup. Montreal
goaltender Rogie Vachon limited St. Louis to three goals in four games and
his first career playoff shutout.

Montreal Canadiens vs. St. Louis Blues

Montreal wins the series 4–0.

Player statistics

Regular season
Scoring

Goaltending

Playoffs
Scoring

Goaltending

Awards and records
 Red Berenson, most goals in one road game (6), achieved on November 7, 1968, vs. Philadelphia

Draft picks
St. Louis's picks at the 1968 NHL Entry Draft.

References

External links
 Blues on Hockey Database
 

 

St. Louis Blues seasons
St. Louis
St. Louis
St Louis
St Louis